We Are Men is an American sitcom television series created by Rob Greenberg starring Christopher Nicholas Smith, Tony Shalhoub, Jerry O'Connell, Kal Penn, and Rebecca Breeds. The series aired on CBS as part of the 2013–14 American television season, and premiered on September 30, 2013. After the airing of two episodes, which performed poorly, CBS announced that the series had been cancelled on October 9, 2013.

Premise
After Carter is left at the altar by his bride, he moves into a short-term rental complex, where he forms a friendship with three divorced older men.

Cast

 Kal Penn as Gil Bartis
 Chris Smith as Carter Thomas
 Jerry O'Connell as Stuart Strickland
 Tony Shalhoub as Frank Russo
 Rebecca Breeds as Abby Russo

Development and production
On July 10, 2012, it was announced that CBS had picked up Rob Greenberg's single-camera comedy, then called Ex-Men, as the first pilot order of the 2013–14 season. The show, which is written, directed and executively produced by Greenberg, centers on a young man "learning the ways of the world from the older and more experienced men in his short-term rental complex." Dominic Patten from Deadline Hollywood reported that We Are Men had been around for a few years, before it was picked up.

Chris Smith was cast as Carter Thomas, the young man who befriends a group of divorced men, while Kal Penn was cast as Gil Bartis. On August 15, 2012, it was announced that Tony Shalhoub would play Frank, who is "a four-time divorcé who still fancies himself a ladies man". Shortly after, Australian actress Rebecca Breeds joined the cast as Frank's daughter. Filming of the pilot episode was pushed back to January 2013, after casting of the fourth male lead stalled. The role of Stuart was eventually filled by Jerry O'Connell.

Episodes

Critical reception
We Are Men was panned by critics. Metacritic gave the show an aggregate rating of 33/100; similarly Rotten Tomatoes currently has a rating of 4% (rotten) for the program. Melissa Maers of Entertainment Weekly said that the show was "The male version of Sex and the City with more shirtless scenes (courtesy of Jerry O'Connell) and way less wit", while The Hollywood Reporter was much more harsh, saying “‘We Are Men’ is about four single guys you wouldn't ever want to be around or be related to in any way … [it] made me feel stupid almost immediately and then bitter that I'd wasted the time.” The show failed to catch an audience and adversely affected other programming, especially the sitcom 2 Broke Girls. The show earned the lowest rating of any 2011 premiere on CBS and was cancelled after just two episodes, leaving the remaining 9 episodes that were produced unaired.

References

External links
 
 
 We Are Men at TV by the Numbers

2010s American single-camera sitcoms
2013 American television series debuts
2013 American television series endings
CBS original programming
English-language television shows
Television series by CBS Studios
Television shows set in Los Angeles